Chaetoplea is a genus of fungi in the family Phaeosphaeriaceae; according to the 2007 Outline of Ascomycota, the placement in this family is uncertain.

References

Phaeosphaeriaceae